Roberto Jesús Melián Bolaños (born 18 December 1994) is a Spanish footballer who plays as an attacking midfielder for CD Atlético Paso.

Club career
Born in Las Palmas, Canary Islands, Bolaños represented Unión Pedro Hidalgo and UD Las Palmas as a youth. In 2014, he moved to Real Sporting San José, being regularly used in Tercera División.

On 2 July 2015 Bolaños joined CD Tenerife, being initially assigned to the reserves also in the fourth tier. On 26 November of the following year he made his first team debut, coming on as a late substitute for goalscorer Suso Santana in a 3–1 Segunda División away win against CD Lugo.

In June 2019, after spending the majority of the 2018–19 season nursing a knee injury, Bolaños left the Chicharreros as his contract expired. He subsequently represented fourth division side CD Atlético Paso before joining UD San Sebastián de los Reyes in Segunda División B on 24 January 2020.

In June 2020, Bolaños returned to his previous side Atlético Paso.

References

External links

1995 births
Living people
Footballers from Las Palmas
Spanish footballers
Association football midfielders
Segunda División players
Segunda División B players
Tercera División players
CD Tenerife B players
CD Tenerife players
UD San Sebastián de los Reyes players